Ligure may refer to:

The Ligurian language, spoken in Liguria in northern Italy
Ligure (train), a Trans Europ Express (TEE) that ran between Milano C and Marseille / Avignon
In the Biblical book of Exodus, a stone in the third row of the High Priest's Breastplate.

See also 
 Ligures, an ancient people of Liguria
  ('Ligure' is a subsidiary part of several Italian place names)